An associated state is the minor partner in a formal, free relationship between a political territory (some of them dependent states, most of them fully sovereign) and a major party—usually a larger nation.

The details of such free association are contained in United Nations General Assembly resolution 1541 (XV) Principle VI, a Compact of Free Association or Associated Statehood Act and are specific to the countries involved. In the case of the Cook Islands and Niue, the details of their free association arrangement are contained in several documents, such as their respective constitutions, the 1983 Exchange of Letters between the governments of New Zealand and the Cook Islands, and the 2001 Joint Centenary Declaration. Free associated states can be described as independent or not, but free association is not a qualification of an entity's statehood or status as a subject of international law.

Informally it can be considered more widely: from a post-colonial form of amical protection, or protectorate, to confederation of unequal members when the lesser partners delegate to the major one (often the former colonial power) some authority normally exclusively retained by a sovereign state, usually in such fields as defense and foreign relations, while often enjoying favorable economic terms such as market access.

According to some scholars, a form of association based on benign protection and delegation of sovereignty can be seen as a defining feature of microstates.

A federacy, a type of government where at least one of the subunits in an otherwise unitary state enjoys autonomy like a subunit within a federation, is similar to an associated state, with such subunits having considerable independence in internal issues, except foreign affairs and defense. Yet in terms of international law it is a completely different situation because the subunits are not independent international entities and have no potential right to independence.

Origin of the concept
The concept of associated state was originally used to refer to arrangements under which Western powers afforded a (sometimes very limited) degree of self-government to some of their colonial possessions after the end of World War II. Soon after the conclusion of the war, the French colonial territories of Vietnam, Cambodia, and Laos were designated as 'associated states' within the newly created French Union. The arrangement afforded these countries a limited degree of internal and external sovereignty (for example, they were allowed to enter into diplomatic relations with a small number of countries), but for the most part reserved for France effective control over foreign relations, as well as military, judicial, administrative, and economic activities. According to some French jurists, the concept of associated state under the 1946 French constitution automatically extended to the territories of Morocco and Tunisia, which up until then had been protectorates of France. However, unlike their counterparts in Southeast Asia, neither Morocco nor Tunisia became part of the French Union. The associated state concept as applied to former French colonial possessions has been described as 'neo-colonial' as it did not afford them real internal or external sovereignty. All of the aforementioned associated states eventually became fully independent states.

Puerto Rico has been a dependent territory of the United States since the Spanish–American War. In the Spanish-language version of its current (1952) constitution it is officially named , which translates to "Free Associated State of Puerto Rico." It exercises substantial internal self-government similar to U.S. states, and is under the sovereignty of the U.S. Constitution. Unlike the Marshall Islands, Micronesia, and Palau, Puerto Rico is not considered to be an associated state under U.S. domestic law, with the English-language Puerto Rican constitution referring to it as a 'commonwealth.' The official Spanish name of Puerto Rico can lead observers to believe that its political status is equivalent to that of the associated states of Cook Islands, Marshall Islands, Micronesia, Niue and Palau. However, unlike these polities, Puerto Rico is not considered a state under international law and scholars usually do not regard it as an associated state similar to the others. Puerto Rico retains the right to choose free association, full independence, or becoming a U.S. state.

When New Zealand offered an associated status to the Cook Islands, they involved the United Nations and included in the agreement the possibility of future independence. These considerations became relevant in later Special Committee on Decolonization debates on the West Indies Associated States.

States currently in a formal association
The Cook Islands and Niue have the status of "self-government in free association". New Zealand cannot legislate for them, and in some situations they are considered sovereign states. In foreign relations, both interact as sovereign states, and they have been allowed to sign on as a state to United Nations treaties and bodies. Neither has decided to join the United Nations, as New Zealand has expressed a view that such a move would lead to their loss of right to automatic acquisition of New Zealand citizenship. However, New Zealand has never formally opposed such application, nor has it argued that either country would not be within its sovereign right to do so. Both Niue and the Cook Islands have established their own nationality and immigration regimes.

The Federated States of Micronesia (since 1986), the Marshall Islands (since 1986), and Palau (since 1994) are associated with the United States under what is known as the Compact of Free Association, giving the states international sovereignty and ultimate control over their territory. However, the governments of those areas have agreed to allow the United States to provide defense; the U.S. federal government provides funding grants and access to U.S. social services for citizens of these areas. The United States benefits from its ability to use the islands as strategic military bases.

Former associated states
A formal association existed under the West Indies Act 1967 between the United Kingdom and the six West Indies Associated States. These were former British colonies in the Caribbean: Antigua (1967–1981), Dominica (1967–1978), Grenada (1967–1974), Saint Christopher-Nevis-Anguilla (1967–1983), Saint Lucia (1967–1979), and Saint Vincent (1969–1979). Under this arrangement, each state had internal self-government, but the UK retained responsibility for foreign relations and defence. The United Nations never determined whether these associated states had achieved a full measure of self-government within the meaning of the United Nations Charter and General Assembly resolutions. Within a few years after the status of associated state was created, all six of the former associated states requested and were granted full independence, except for Anguilla within the former St. Kitts-Nevis-Anguilla union, which separated from the associated state before independence and became a United Kingdom dependent territory on its own.

Shortly before the dissolution of the Soviet Union, the autonomous Soviet republic of Tatarstan declared itself a "sovereign state" and a "subject of international law". Tatarstan and the recently formed Russian Federation entered into a treaty in 1994 specifying that Tatarstan was "associated" with the latter (rather than being an integral part of it). Through the agreement, Tatarstan delegated certain powers (such as some foreign relations and defense) to Russia. Changes made to Tatarstan's constitution in 2002 have been seen by some commentators as fundamentally changing this relationship, with Tatarstan now functioning as essentially an integral part of Russia.

Proposed associated states
While Puerto Rico is described as a 'free associated state' under its Spanish-language constitution, its status is not equivalent to that of a separate state under international law, since it legally remains a US territory. Some scholars have proposed the decolonization of Puerto Rico by means of a free association agreement with the US similar to those in force in the Marshall Islands, Micronesia, and Palau. A similar path has been proposed in order to update the political relationship between the Faroe Islands and Denmark, in which the former would become an associated state of the latter.

The government of the US unincorporated territory of Guam, led by then-Governor Eddie Calvo, started campaigning in early 2011 for a plebiscite on Guam's future political status, with free association following the model of the Marshall Islands, Micronesia, and Palau as one of the possible options. The plebiscite, however, only allowed "native inhabitants" as defined under Guam law to register for it. A white, non-Chamorro resident, Arnold Davis, filed a federal lawsuit in 2011 for being denied registration for the plebiscite and a July 2019 ruling by the United States Court of Appeals for the Ninth Circuit ultimately blocked the plebiscite on the basis that the law was race-based and violated constitutionally protected voting rights; the Supreme Court of the United States declined to hear the Government of Guam's appeal in May 2020.

In 2003, then-Basque Country president Juan José Ibarretxe proposed to the Spanish Congress of Deputies a reform that would have transformed the region from an autonomous community within Spain into a state in free association, therefore making Spain into a confederal state. The proposal was overwhelmingly rejected by the Congress.

Tokelau (a dependent territory of New Zealand) voted on a referendum in February 2006 to determine whether it wanted to remain a New Zealand territory or become the third state in free association with New Zealand (after the Cook Islands and Niue). While a majority of voters chose free association, the vote did not meet the two-thirds threshold needed for approval. A repeat referendum in October 2007 under United Nations supervision yielded similar results, with the proposed free association falling 16 votes short of approval.

The establishment of a Bangsamoro Juridical Entity (BJE) was proposed in 2008 by the Moro Islamic Liberation Front and the Philippines. The two parties were to sign a memorandum of agreement on ancestral domain which would lead to the establishment of the Bangsamoro region. However the deal was halted by the Supreme Court which ruled that the BJE's proposed "associative relationship" with the Philippine national government is incompatible with the country's constitution.

Some form of free association has been suggested as a solution to occasional calls of self-determination by the people of Tobago, the smaller island within the nation of Trinidad and Tobago, either within the single state (analogous to the situation of Scotland within the United Kingdom) or as a separate political entity.

According to statements of officials of Abkhazia and Transnistria (self-proclaimed partially recognized republics seceded from the former USSR's constituent republics of Georgia and Moldova respectively), both intend, after recognition of their independence, to become associated states of the Russian Federation. In Transnistria a referendum took place in September 2006, in which secession from Moldova and "future free association" with Russia was approved by a margin of 97%, even though the results of the referendum were internationally unrecognized.

Other comparable relationships
Other situations exist where one state has power over another political unit. Dependent territories and the United Kingdom's Crown dependencies are examples of this, where an area has its own political system and often internal self-government, but does not have overall sovereignty. In a loose form of association, some sovereign states cede some power to other states, often in terms of foreign affairs and defense.

States currently ceding power to another state

States formerly ceding power to another state
Iceland, formerly part of the Kingdom of Denmark, became a nominally sovereign state in 1918. It remained in personal union with the Danish Crown and continued to have a common foreign policy with Denmark until 1944, when it became fully independent.

Bhutan, a former protectorate of British India, agreed in a 1949 treaty to allow the recently created state of India to guide its foreign relations in a relatively loose form of association, which resulted in Bhutan sometimes being described as a "protected state". This relationship was updated in a 2007 treaty, in which the provision requiring Bhutan to accept India's guidance on foreign policy was rescinded.

Microstates as modern protected states
The existence of free relationship based on both delegation of sovereignty and benign protection can be seen as a defining feature of microstates. According to the definition of microstates proposed by Dumienski (2014): "Microstates are modern protected states, i.e. sovereign states that have been able to unilaterally depute certain attributes of sovereignty to larger powers in exchange for benign protection of their political and economic viability against their geographic or demographic constraints." Adopting this approach permits separating microstates from both small states and autonomies or dependencies. Microstates understood as modern protected states include such states as Liechtenstein, San Marino, Monaco, Vatican City, Andorra, Niue, the Cook Islands, and Palau.

See also
 Commonwealth realm
 Crown dependency
 Dominion
 External association, 1921 proposed relationship between Ireland and the United Kingdom

Notes

References 

Client state
Constitutional state types
 
Political systems